Allaxa (Greek: Άλλαξα) is the ninth studio album by Greek singer Despina Vandi. It was released on 27 April 2012 by The Spicy Effect and certified double-platinum, selling over 24,000 units, becoming Despina's first double-platinum album since 2005. It contains twelve songs with songwriter and producer Phoebus involved on every track, and is the last cooperation of them. On 26 April 2012, Despina revealed on her Twitter account that, after the release of the singles Mou 'Heis Perasei and Girismata in 2011, she will release a full-length album. Phoebus is the producer and songwriter of the entire album.

Release and promotion 
Since now, Despina and her label consider to promote the CD through internet and of course, iTunes. Tiletheatis, the famous Greek showbiz weekly magazine is a big sponsor for the album Allaxa. In the same day of the release, the magazine will offer as a gift the new album.

Singles and music videos
"Mou 'Heis Perasei"
The song title was first announced on 17 November 2011, with a teaser video from Spicy Music's YouTube Channel. Four days later, on 21 November 2011, a second teaser video was uploaded with some lyrics of the song and the release date. On 23 November 2011, Despina, in cooperation with the radio station Rithmos 94.9, presented her new song in the club-restaurant DC (Dream City), at a party for listeners of the station. The single was released to Greek radio on 24 November 2011, first from the radio station Rithmos 94.9 and uploaded onto YouTube by Spicy Music. The song was released as a digital download on 13 December 2011 and is the lead single of the album.

"Girismata"
The second single called "Girismata" and is a laiko song reminding Despina since 2000's. The single was released to Greek radios and uploaded onto YouTube by Spicy Music on 13 December 2011. Also, she was seen filming the music video for "Girismata" on 15 February 2012. The next day, the image maker Alexandra Katsaiti uploaded onto Twitter and Facebook some photos from backstage.

"To Nisi"
The third single called "To Nisi" and is a greek laiko-nisiotiko song that reminds a Despina from an old season, mainly because of the use of zither (greek traditional instrument). The single released by Spicy on 22 April 2012. On 7 May 2012, Despoina arrived to Skiathos island to film the music video and released on 13 June 2012, directed by Kostas Kapetanidis.

"Katalavaino"
The fifth single called "Katalavaino" which released by Spicy on 18 September 2012 and is a pop slow ballad. The video clip of song released on 7 January 2013 and directed by Pillow Talk.

Track listing

Release history

Charts

Credits and personnel
Credits adapted from the album's liner notes.

Personnel 
Eleanna Azouki: backing vocals (tracks: 2, 5, 8)

Alexandros Bosinakos: backing vocals (tracks: 2, 5, 8)

Christos Bousdoukos: cello, violin (tracks: 1)

Giorgos Chatzopoulos: guitars (all tracks)

Nikos Chatzopoulos: violin (tracks: 8)

Simela Christopoulou: backing vocals (tracks: 5)

Akis Diximos: backing vocals (tracks: 2, 5, 8) || second vocal (tracks: 1, 2, 3, 4, 6, 7, 8, 9, 10, 11, 12)

Kostas Doxas: backing vocals (tracks: 2, 8)

Giorgos Florakis: backing vocals (tracks: 2)

Charis Galanis: backing vocals (tracks: 5)

Antonis Gounaris: bass (tracks: 8) || bouzouki, keyboards, orchestration, programming (tracks: 12) || cümbüş, tzoura (tracks: 2) || guitars (tracks: 3) || mandolin (tracks: 3, 10) || ukulele (tracks: 10)

Telis Kafkas: bass (tracks: 3, 6, 9, 10)

Alexandra Likoudi: backing vocals (tracks: 1, 2, 8)

Vivian Nikolaidi: backing vocals (tracks: 1, 2, 5, 8)

Vasilis Nikolopoulos: keyboards, orchestration, programming (tracks: 1, 2, 3, 4, 5, 6, 7, 8, 9, 10, 11)

Thimios Papadopoulos: clarinet (tracks: 5) || flute (tracks: 2, 4, 6, 7) || fife (tracks: 2, 4)

Spiros Patapis: lute (tracks: 1)

Phoebus: keyboards (tracks: 1, 2, 3, 4, 5, 6, 7, 8, 9, 10, 11) || orchestration (tracks: 1, 2, 3, 4, 5, 6, 7, 8, 9, 10, 11, 12) || programming (tracks: 1, 3, 4, 7, 11)

Lefteris Pouliou: saxophone (tracks: 11)

Giorgos Roilos: percussion (tracks: 1, 2, 8)

Rozanna Tseliou: backing vocals (tracks: 1)

Stella Valasi: zither (tracks: 1)

Despina Vandi: second vocal (tracks: 9)

Production 
Vasilis Nikolopoulos: mix engineer

Phoebus: executive producer, mix engineer

Vaggelis Siapatis: co-producer, editing, sound engineer

Paul Stefanidis (Viking Lounge studio): mastering

Cover 
Kostas Avgoulis: photographer

Dimitris Giannetos: hair styling, make up

Alexandra Katsaiti: styling

Thodoris Lalagkas: art direction

References

External links
Official website

2012 albums
Despina Vandi albums
Albums produced by Phoebus (songwriter)
The Spicy Effect albums
Greek-language albums